Philippine legislative election, 1931 may refer to:
1931 Philippine House of Representatives elections
1931 Philippine Senate elections